Opisthopterus is a genus of longfin herring in the family Pristigasteridae. There are currently six species in this genus.

Species
 Opisthopterus dovii (Günther, 1868) (Dove's longfin herring)
 Opisthopterus effulgens (Regan, 1903) (Vaqueira longfin herring)
 Opisthopterus equatorialis Hildebrand, 1946 (Equatorial longfin herring)
 Opisthopterus macrops (Günther, 1867) (Bigeyed longfin herring)
 Opisthopterus tardoore (Cuvier, 1829) (Tardoore)
 Opisthopterus valenciennesi Bleeker, 1872 (Slender tardoor)

References
 

Pristigasteridae
Ray-finned fish genera
Marine fish genera
Taxa named by Theodore Gill